The List of religious buildings and structures of the Kingdom of Mysore includes notable and historically important Hindu temples, royal palaces, churches, mosques, military fortification and other courtly structures that were built or received significant embellishment by the rulers of the Kingdom of Mysore. The term "Kingdom of Mysore" broadly covers the various stages the Mysore establishment went through: A Vijayanagara vassal (c. 1399 – 1565), an independent Hindu Kingdom ruled by the Wodeyar dynasty (c. 1565 – 1761), ruled by the de facto rulers Hyder Ali and Tipu Sultan who took control of the Kingdom (c. 1761 – 1799), and a princely monarchy under the British Raj (c. 1799 – 1950) before the establishment became a part of an independent India.

References

Mysore
Mysore, religious buildings
Religious buildings and structures of the Kingdom of Mysore
Kingdom of Mysore